Live is the first video album and first live release by English band Sade. It was released on 22 November 1994 on VHS by Epic Records, followed by a DVD release on 20 February 2001. It was filmed during the last two shows of the band's Love Deluxe World Tour at the SDSU Open Air Theatre in San Diego, California, on 2 and 3 October 1993.

Track listing
"The Sweetest Taboo"
"Keep Looking"
"Your Love Is King"
"Love Is Stronger Than Pride"
"Smooth Operator"
"Red Eye"
"Haunt Me"
"Like a Tattoo"
"Kiss of Life"
"Nothing Can Come Between Us"
"Cherry Pie"
"Pearls"
"No Ordinary Love"
"Is It a Crime?"
"Cherish the Day"
"Paradise"
"Jezebel

Personnel
Credits adapted from the liner notes of Live.

Sade
 Sade Adu – lead vocals
 Andrew Hale – keyboards
 Stuart Matthewman – guitar, saxophone
 Paul S. Denman – bass

Additional personnel
 Rick Braun - trumpet
 Karl Van Den Bossche – percussion
 Gordon Hunte - guitar
 Trevor Murrell - drums
 Leroy Osbourne - backing vocals
 Mike Pela - mixing

Charts

Certifications

References

1994 live albums
1994 video albums
Epic Records live albums
Epic Records video albums
Live video albums
Sade (band) live albums